Iván Marcelo Pardo Córdova (born 10 November 1995) is a Chilean former footballer who last played for Trasandino as a midfielder.

Career

Youth career

Pardo started his career at Primera División de Chile club O'Higgins. He progressed from the under categories club all the way to the senior team.

O'Higgins

Pardo won the Apertura 2013-14 with O'Higgins, in the 2013–14 Súper Final Apertura against Universidad Católica, being the first title for O'Higgins.

In 2014, he won the Supercopa de Chile against Deportes Iquique, in the match that O'Higgins won at the penalty shoot-out.

He participated with the club in the 2014 Copa Libertadores where they faced Deportivo Cali, Cerro Porteño and Lanús, being third and being eliminated in the group stage.

International career

He was part of the Chile national under-20 football team, who played the 2015 South American Youth Championship in Uruguay.

Honours

Club
O'Higgins
Primera División: Apertura 2013-14
Supercopa de Chile: 2014

Individual

O'Higgins
Medalla Santa Cruz de Triana: 2014

References

External links
 
 Pardo at Football Lineups

1995 births
Living people
People from Cachapoal Province
Chilean footballers
Chile under-20 international footballers
O'Higgins F.C. footballers
San Marcos de Arica footballers
Deportes Colchagua footballers
C.D. Arturo Fernández Vial footballers
Ñublense footballers
Trasandino footballers
Chilean Primera División players
Primera B de Chile players
Segunda División Profesional de Chile players
2015 South American Youth Football Championship players
Association football midfielders